Felix Dale Stone House, also known as the L.R. Parks House, is a historic home located at College Township, Centre County, Pennsylvania.  It was built in 1823, and is a two-story, five-bay, Georgian styled stone farmhouse with a gable roof. It features two front entrances with a hipped roof porch. The interior has a center hall plan and features finely crafted woodwork.

It was added to the National Register of Historic Places in 1982.

References

Houses on the National Register of Historic Places in Pennsylvania
Georgian architecture in Pennsylvania
Houses completed in 1823
Houses in Centre County, Pennsylvania
National Register of Historic Places in Centre County, Pennsylvania